Marjina Horka or Maryina Gorka is a town in Minsk Region, Belarus, and the administrative center of Pukhavichy District. As of 2009 its population was 22,500.

It is traversed by the M5 highway, between Minsk and Babruysk.

History
The town was first mentioned in 1222 and received its town status in 1955.
 
The 5th Spetsnaz Brigade, first of the Soviet Spetsnaz GRU, now of the Armed Forces of Belarus, has been located in Marjina Horka since 1963.

Media
The local newspaper "Puchavičy naviny" ". The newspaper is published  since May 1, 1931 on Wednesdays and Saturdays. The circulation of the newspaper is 4,540 copies.

The Advertising newspaper "Region".  The newspaper is published  since June 13, 2000 on Wednesdays and Saturdays. The circulation of the newspaper is 10,000 copies.

See also
FC Rudensk

References

External links

 Maryina Horka official website

 
Towns in Belarus
1222 establishments in Europe
Igumensky Uyezd
Holocaust locations in Belarus